Scene of the Crime is a 1949 film noir directed by Roy Rowland, starring Van Johnson, and featuring Gloria DeHaven, Arlene Dahl, and Tom Drake. The film's screenplay, by Charles Schnee, is based on a non-fiction article by John Bartlow Martin, "Smashing the Bookie Gang Marauders".  It was the only property sold by Martin to be made into a film.  Scene of the Crime was producer Harry Rapf's last film of his thirty-plus year career; he died of a heart attack a week after principal photography for the film began.

According to film critic Dennis Schwartz: "[The film is one of] few film noirs attempted by MGM. It came when Dore Schary was the studio head and insisted on producing more realistic films. This is a transitional film from the 1930s gangster film and a forerunner of the modern day TV cop show. It preaches the credo that 'Crime Does Not Pay'."

Plot

Lieutenant Mike Conovan (Van Johnson), head of an LAPD homicide detective squad, investigates when Ed Monigan, an older member of his squad (and former partner), is murdered while off-duty and carrying $1,000 in cash.  Conovan's current partner and one-time mentor, Fred Piper (John McIntire), is getting on in years and his eyesight is failing, while under Conovan's wing is rookie detective "C.C." (for "carbon copy") Gordon (Tom Drake), learning the ropes.

Out to dispel a theory that Monigan was secretly in cahoots with bookmakers, Conovan begins to track down a pair of downstate criminals ("lobos") known as the "Royalty Brothers". (He repeatedly refers to the gangsters as "guns.") The trail leads to a stripper, Lili (Gloria DeHaven), whose ex-boyfriend Turk Kingby (Richard Benedict) has apparently pulled off a series of robberies of gamblers with his partner Lafe Douque (William Haade). Conovan's primary informant, Sleeper (Norman Lloyd), is brutally murdered for snitching. Conovan tracks down Lafe and places him under arrest, but leaving Lafe's apartment, gunshots ring out, killing Lafe. Conovan is convinced by his wife Gloria (Arlene Dahl) that police work is too dangerous. He agrees and tenders his resignation.

Lili calls headquarters with a tip for Conovan on where Turk can be found. Piper intercepts the message, investigates it himself and is gunned down.  Conovan concludes that Lili has been double-crossing him, secretly helping Turk all along. Over the objections of his wife, he gets his old job back with the police force.  Turk and his new partner attempt to flee, but Conovan sets up an ambush. He uses a truck to crash into Turk's armor-plated car, causing it to catch fire. Turk confesses to the murders and clears Monigan before he dies.

Cast

 Van Johnson as Mike Conovan
 Arlene Dahl as Gloria Conovan
 Gloria DeHaven as Lili
 Tom Drake as Detective "C.C." Gordon
 Leon Ames as Captain A.C. Forster
 John McIntire as Detective Fred Piper
 Donald Woods as Bob Herkimer
 Norman Lloyd as Sleeper
 Jerome Cowan as Arthur Webson
 Tom Powers as Umpire Menafoe
 Richard Benedict as Turk Kingby
 Anthony Caruso as Tony Rutzo
 Robert Gist as P.J. Pontiac
 Romo Vincent as Hippo
 Tom Helmore as Norrie Lorfield
 Caleb Peterson as Loomis
 William Haade as Lafe Douque

Cast notes
Donna Reed was originally slated to play the part played in the film by Arlene Dahl.
Gloria DeHaven's character, Lili, was modeled on stripper Lili St. Cyr

Production
MGM, Hollywood's "Tiffany Studio", had a long history of making glamorous films, especially musicals, and shied away from making gutty, street-wise films, such as Warner Bros. specialized in.  The exceptions were their series of "Crime Does Not Pay" shorts – where director Roy Rowland learned the ins and outs of that genre – and the occasional films in the 1930s and 1940s, such as Kid Glove Killer and Grand Central Murder, both released in 1942. Once Dore Schary returned to MGM in 1948 from his stint at RKO Pictures, to replace Louis B. Mayer as head of production, the studio began to make darker, more realistic films. Scene of the Crime was the result of that transition.

The casting for Scene of the Crime went "against type". Star Van Johnson was known for appearing in light fare such as comedies and musicals, making him a teen idol, so a hard-boiled cop was a complete change for him, and his newly revealed versatility garnered him roles in 1949's Battleground and the offer to play Eliot Ness in The Untouchables on TV, a role that went instead to Robert Stack.  Although Scene of the Crime made a small profit, primarily because of its low production cost, Van Johnson would never make another film noir.

Gloria DeHaven was also making a change for her role in the film.  She had been known for playing sweet, innocent ingenues, like Johnson in comedies and musicals.  It was Schary's decision to cast her as Lili, a stripper who appears at first to have a heart of gold, but turns out to be a hard-boiled gangster's moll.  Unable to show a stripper actually stripping, the film shows her doing a "reverse strip": Lili starts in a – for the time – skimpy outfit, and puts her clothes on while singing Andre Previn and William Katz' song "I'm a Goody Good Girl".  As with Johnson, the film opened up new possibilities for DeHaven. As opposed to DeHaven, the third major actor in Street of the Crime, the glamorous Arlene Dahl, might normally have been expected to play the stripper role, instead of a nagging housewife.

Director Roy Rowland was a long-time stalwart at MGM, directing shorts, B-movies, and a variety of other films.  He would make two additional film noirs, Rogue Cop and Witness to Murder, starring Barbara Stanwyck, both released in 1954.  Rowland is probably best known for directing a cult film, The 5000 Fingers of Dr. T, written by Dr. Seuss.

Reception

Box office
According to MGM records, the film earned US$968,000 in the US and Canada and $423,000 overseas resulting in a profit of $151,000.

Critical response
Critic Dennis Schwartz liked the film: "It is directed in a workman like efficiency by Roy Rowland (Rogue Cop) ... It's filmed Dragnet style, following ordinary police procedures in solving the case. The film had a violent conclusion, which underscores the dangers of being an urban cop. It portrayed the hard-working policemen in a sympathetic light and showed how they are often misunderstood by the public and betrayed at times by reporters who are eager to grab the headlines and run with them even though they don't have all the facts. Mike comes out as a good cop, but is disillusioned by his low pay and all the pressures from home, the job and its politics, and from an unappreciative public."

Awards and honors
 Edgar Award - Best Motion Picture (nominated, 1950)

See also
Film noir

References

External links
 
 
 
 
 Scene of the Crime informational site and DVD review at DVD Beaver (includes images)
 

1949 films
1949 drama films
American crime drama films
American black-and-white films
American detective films
Films scored by André Previn
Film noir
Films directed by Roy Rowland
Films produced by Harry Rapf
Films set in Los Angeles
Films set in the 1940s
Metro-Goldwyn-Mayer films
1940s English-language films
1940s American films